Dan Petersen (born 6 May 1972) is a Danish former professional footballer who played as a forward.

At Monaco he was part of the side that won the 1996–97 French Division 1 title, making 10 appearances in the process.

References

External links
 Danish national team profile
 

1972 births
Living people
Footballers from Odense
Danish men's footballers
Denmark under-21 international footballers
Association football forwards
Odense Boldklub players
AFC Ajax players
AS Monaco FC players
R.S.C. Anderlecht players
SC Bastia players
Danish Superliga players
Eredivisie players
Ligue 1 players
Belgian Pro League players
Danish expatriate men's footballers
Danish expatriate sportspeople in the Netherlands
Expatriate footballers in the Netherlands
Danish expatriate sportspeople in France
Expatriate footballers in France
Danish expatriate sportspeople in Monaco
Expatriate footballers in Monaco
Danish expatriate sportspeople in Belgium
Expatriate footballers in Belgium
UEFA Cup winning players